An agnomen (plural: agnomina),  in the Roman naming convention, was a nickname, just as the cognomen was initially. However, the cognomina eventually became family names, so agnomina were needed to distinguish between similarly named persons. However, as the agnomen was an additional and optional component in a Roman name, not all Romans had an agnomen (at least not one that is recorded).

Pseudo-Probus uses the hero of the Punic Wars, Publius Cornelius Scipio Africanus, as an example:

Marius Victorinus further elucidates:

Africanus, Creticus and the likes are also known as victory titles. For example, Gaius Marcius Coriolanus earned his from the capture of Corioli.

Etymology
Latin agnōmen (also spelled ) comes from ad "to" and nōmen "name".

Caligula
As a minimum, a Roman agnomen is a name attached to an individual's full titulature after birth and formal naming by the family.  True Roman nicknames, fully replacing the individual's name in usage, are rare.  One such example where the nickname fully replaced the individual's name in usage was the Emperor Caligula, where that name was used in place of, and not along with, his full name, which was Gaius Julius Caesar Augustus Germanicus.  Caligula's praenomen was Gaius, his nomen Julius, his cognomen Caesar.  Some agnomina were inherited like cognomen were, thus establishing a sub-family. Caligula's agnomen came from the little boots he wore as part of his miniature soldier's uniform while accompanying his father Germanicus on campaigns in northern Germania. In turn, Germanicus received his agnomen in 9 BC, when it was posthumously awarded to his father Nero Claudius Drusus in honour of his Germanic victories. At birth, Germanicus had been known as either Nero Claudius Drusus after his father or Tiberius Claudius Nero after his uncle. As with Caligula, Germanicus is mostly referred to by his agnomen.

Agnomens and pseudonyms
Parallel examples of agnomina from later times are epithets like Thomas Jonathan "Stonewall" Jackson (though he is known more often by his agnomen than his first name) or popular nicknames like "Iron" Mike Tyson or Dwayne "The Rock" Johnson.

See also
List of Imperial Roman victory titles
Nomen (Roman name)
Praenomen
Nomen nescio
Courtesy name

References

Roman naming conventions